The Center for Urban Pedagogy (CUP) is a  nonprofit organization that uses the power of design and art to improve the quality of public participation in urban planning and community design.

History 
CUP was founded in 1997 by the artist and architect Damon Rich with co-founders Oscar Tuazon (artist), Stella Bugbee (graphic designer), Josh Breitbart (media activist), Jason Anderson (architect), AJ Blandford (architectural historian), Sarah Dadush (attorney), Althea Wasow (filmmaker), and Rosten Woo (policy analyst).

During the fall of 2003, at the Storefront for Art and Architecture, the CUP organized the exhibition City Without a Ghetto themed on the development of low-cost housing in New York City since the late 1940s.

In 2011, the CUP received a Rockefeller CIF award to develop its Public Access Design project. The project aimed to connect graphic designers and distressed communities. In November 2018, the CUP partnered with New York's Drawing Center to advocate civic engagement through drawing and design.

Description 
The Center for Urban Pedagogy is a 501(c)(3) nonprofit organization located in Gowanus, Brooklyn, New York City. CUP's current executive director is Christine Gaspar.

Its goal is to communicate on the law as clearly as possible, in areas where there is a low level of education on legal matters. The CUP released the " Vendor Power" booklet informing NYC's street vendors on the law and their rights, "I Got Arrested" for underage persons getting arrested, "Know Your Lines" to raise the issue of regional lines modifications during electoral ballots.

References

Bibliography 
 Francisca Benítez, "La Ciudad Como Escuela", ARQ, December 2006, p. 28.
 Carly Berwick, "Civic Boosters", Metropolis, February 2002.
 Bill Menking, (2009). "The Center for Urban Pedagogy (CUP)". Architectural Design : A.D. 79 (1): 76.
 Lize Mogel, and Alexis Bhagat. (2008). An atlas of radical cartography. Los Angeles: Journal of Aesthetics & Protest Press.
 
 Rich, Damon, “Notes on Pedagogy as Aesthetic Practice” in Experimental Geography: Radical Approaches to Landscape, Cartography, and Urbanism, edited by Nato Thompson. New York: Independent Curators International and Melville House, 2008.
 Architecture for Humanity (Organization). (2006). Design like you give a damn: architectural responses to humanitarian crises. New York, NY: Metropolis Books.
 Rich, Damon, “Big Plans & Little People,” Lotus International 124, Milan, Italy, July 2005.
 Zacks, Stephen. (2011). "Détournement or the Misguided Oppositional Ideology of the Posturban College-Educated Elite". Tarp Architectural Manual. : Spring 2011:14.
 “On Education, Pluralist Planning, New Institutions and Language: Public Interview with Damon Rich"
 Rice, Michael, ”An Architektur", September 2008.

External links
 Official website

Non-profit organizations based in New York (state)
Pedagogy